Dom António II Ribeiro (21 May 1928 – 24 March 1998) was a Portuguese cardinal of the Roman Catholic Church, who was Patriarch of Lisbon from 1971 until his death in 1998.

Born at São Clemente de Basto, Celorico de Basto, son of José Ribeiro (born ca 1860) and wife Ana Gonçalves (born ca 1904), both from the same location, Ribeiro was ordained as a priest on 5 July 1953 in Braga. On 3 July 1967 he was appointed auxiliary bishop of Braga and titular bishop of Tigillava, and was consecrated a bishop on 17 September.

Ribeiro graduated with a degree in theology from the Pontifical Gregorian University of Rome and lectured in the Superior Institute of Catholic Culture.  His doctoral thesis, written in 1959, was The Doctrine of Errors in Saint Thomas Aquinas. During the 1960s he continued his studies in Braga and was made member of such institutions as the Superior Institute of Social and Political Sciences. He also attended the Theological Faculties of Innsbruck and Munich.

Meanwhile, in 1960 he also began to appear in television with a program called Dia do Senhor (The Lord's Day), and collaborated with several religious magazines and newspapers, beyond his own publications.

On Manuel Gonçalves Cerejeira's retirement as Patriarch in 1971, Ribeiro became his successor. He was appointed Vicar Apostolic of the Portuguese Military in 1972, and was elevated by Pope Paul VI on 5 March 1973 to Cardinal-Priest of Sant'Antonio da Padova in Via Merulana, at the age of 44 becoming the youngest cardinal since Cerejeira himself forty-four years earlier. He remains the youngest cardinal appointed since 1930. He attended the 1978 August and October Conclaves. In 1991, he was the papal envoy to the 5th centennial celebration of evangelization in Luanda, Angola.

Recognised as a man of compromise (and markedly less close to the Estado Novo government than Cerejeira had been), Ribeiro was nevertheless very determined in defending the rights and privileges of the Church in his country.

He died of cancer in Lisbon in 1998 two months before his 70th birthday and is buried in the tomb of the patriarchs in the Monastery of São Vicente de Fora. He was the Principal Consecrator in 1978 of José da Cruz Policarpo, who succeeded him as Patriarch, and in 1989 of Januário Ferreira, who succeeded him as Military vicar of Portugal in 2001.

References

1928 births
1998 deaths
People from Celorico de Basto
20th-century Portuguese cardinals
Archbishops of Lisbon
Cardinals created by Pope Paul VI
Pontifical Gregorian University alumni
Deaths from cancer in Portugal